Chris Flook (born February 1, 1973) is an Olympic and national record holding swimmer from Bermuda. He swam for Bermuda at the 1992 Olympics.

At the 1993 Central American & Caribbean Games, he set the Bermuda Records in the 100 and 200 Breaststrokes (1:04.04 and 2:22.93).

He swam for Bermuda at the:
1994 Commonwealth Games
1993 Central American & Caribbean Games
1992 Olympics
1991 Pan American Games

References

1973 births
Living people
Male breaststroke swimmers
Bermudian male swimmers
Swimmers at the 1991 Pan American Games
Pan American Games competitors for Bermuda
Swimmers at the 1992 Summer Olympics
Olympic swimmers of Bermuda
Swimmers at the 1994 Commonwealth Games
Commonwealth Games competitors for Bermuda
Shippensburg University of Pennsylvania alumni
Central American and Caribbean Games silver medalists for Bermuda
Central American and Caribbean Games bronze medalists for Bermuda
Competitors at the 1993 Central American and Caribbean Games
Central American and Caribbean Games medalists in swimming